Gunnar Sauer (born 11 June 1964) is a German retired professional footballer who played as a central defender, most notably with Werder Bremen.

Over the course of 13 seasons (12 with his main club), he amassed Bundesliga totals of 134 games and eight goals despite being plagued by injuries which kept him out of action for long periods.

Sauer represented West Germany at Euro 1988, but did not gain an international cap.

Club career

Werder Bremen
Born in Cuxhaven, Lower Saxony, most of Sauer's career was spent at SV Werder Bremen. His best years came between 1986–91.

He contributed greatly to Werder Bremen's championship in the 1987–88 Bundesliga season, commanding the "club's probably best ever defence" which conceded just 22 goals.

On 13 September 1988, in a home match against Bayern Munich he injured his foot.

From 1991 injuries kept Sauer out of action for long periods and he was mainly used a backup, making only 17 Bundesliga appearances for Werder Bremen.

During the 1991 DFB-Pokal final against 1. FC Köln, which Werder Bremen won after penalties, Sauer again sustained an injury, hurting his Achilles tendon. This injury required four operations for him to play football again and he made his comeback in April 1994.

Later years
In 1996, Sauer left Werder Bremen having spent 15 years at the club joining Hertha BSC. He helped the club promote from the second division, although he played very little. After one campaign each with VfB Leipzig (second level) and VfB Oldenburg (regional leagues) he retired in 1999 at the age of 35.

International career
Sauer was summoned by the West Germany national team to the UEFA Euro 1988 tournament, but did not leave the bench for the hosts, never being recalled afterwards.

Also in 1988, he was called up for the 1998 Summer Olympics. Due to an injury he did not make an appearance but received a bronze medal.

Style of play
Considered "perhaps the best libero" in his time, Sauer was known for his "elegant ball control" and great range of passing.

Career statistics

Club

Honours
Werder Bremen
 Bundesliga: 1987–88, 1992–93
 DFB-Pokal: 1990–91, 1993–94; runner-up 1988–89, 1989–90
 DFL-Supercup: 1988

Germany
 1988 Summer Olympics: third place

References

External links
 
 

1964 births
Living people
People from Cuxhaven
Footballers from Lower Saxony
German footballers
Association football defenders
Germany under-21 international footballers
UEFA Euro 1988 players
Olympic footballers of West Germany
Footballers at the 1988 Summer Olympics
Olympic bronze medalists for West Germany
Olympic medalists in football
Medalists at the 1988 Summer Olympics
Bundesliga players
2. Bundesliga players
SV Werder Bremen II players
SV Werder Bremen players
Hertha BSC players
1. FC Lokomotive Leipzig players
VfB Oldenburg players
West German footballers